Lars Edström (born 16 July 1966) is a Swedish ice hockey player. He competed in the men's tournament at the 1992 Winter Olympics.

Career statistics

Regular season and playoffs

International

References

External links
 

1966 births
Living people
Olympic ice hockey players of Sweden
Ice hockey players at the 1992 Winter Olympics
People from Arvidsjaur Municipality
Minnesota North Stars draft picks
Luleå HF players
Sportspeople from Norrbotten County